Nuria Llagostera Vives and María José Martínez Sánchez were the defending champions, but Martínez Sánchez decided to not start this year, due to injury.
Llagostera Vives partnered with Arantxa Parra Santonja but lost in the first round 6–2, 6–0 against Elena Vesnina and Vera Zvonareva.
Gisela Dulko and Flavia Pennetta won in the final against Květa Peschke and Katarina Srebotnik, 7–5, 3–6, [12–10].

Seeds
The top four seeds receive a bye into the second round.

Draw

Finals

Top half

Bottom half

External links
 Main Draw

Rogers Cup
Doubles
Rogers